Coongoola is a locality in the Shire of Paroo, Queensland, Australia.

Geography 
The Mitchell Highway passes from north (from Wyandra) to south (to Cunnamulla) through the locality.

References 

Shire of Paroo
Localities in Queensland